= Remigia Salazar =

Filipina writer, editor and printer

Remigia Salazar (1805–1860) was a Filipina writer, editor and printer. She is known as the first woman in the Philippines to be an editor, the owner and manager of a printing press and a publisher. She was also the founder of the first newspaper in the Philippines (1846).
